K-1 World Grand Prix 2010 in Bucharest, billed as Europe's GP, was a kickboxing event held by the K-1 organization in association with the Local Kombat promotion on Friday, May 21, 2010 at the Romexpo Dome in Bucharest, Romania.

Participants

Qualified  
  Daniil Sapljoshin (K-1 World Grand Prix 2010 in Warsaw Champion)
  Mindaugas Sakalauskas (K-1 World Grand Prix 2010 in Vilnius Champion) 
  Roman Kleibl (K-1 ColliZion 2009 Final Tournament Champion)

Wild cards 
  Alexey Ignashov 
  Mighty Mo
  Sergei Lascenko
  Sebastian Ciobanu
  Freddy Kemayo

Background  
The winner made the final 16. K-1 veterans Ray Sefo and Errol Zimmerman padded their resumes with superfights against Ionuț Iftimoaie and Cătălin Moroșanu, respectively.

Results

Heavyweight tournament

See also
List of K-1 events
List of K-1 champions
List of male kickboxers

References

External links
K-1 Official site

K-1 events
2010 in kickboxing
Kickboxing in Romania
Sport in Bucharest